The 51st annual Venice International Film Festival was held on 1 September to 12 September, 1994.

Jury
The following people comprised the 1994 jury:
David Lynch (head of jury)
Olivier Assayas
Margherita Buy
Gaston Kaboré
Nagisa Oshima
David Stratton
Uma Thurman
Mario Vargas Llosa
Carlo Verdone

Official selection

In competition

Out of competition 
Bullets Over Broadway by Woody Allen (United States)
Dichiarazioni d'amore by Pupi Avati (Italy)
Oasi by Cristiano Bortone (Italy)
Staggered by Martin Clunes (United Kingdom) 
Tom & Viv by  Brian Gilbert (United Kingdom)
Genesis: The Creation and the Flood by  Ermanno Olmi (Italy-Germany)
Il Postino: The Postman by  Michael Radford (Italy-France)

Venetian Nights 
Love and Human Remains by  Denys Arcand (Canada)
True Lies by  James Cameron (United States)
47 Ronin by  Kon Ichikawa (Japan)
Wolf  by  Mike Nichols (United States)
Clear and Present Danger  by  Phillip Noyce (United States)
Captives by  Angela Pope (United Kingdom)
The Nightmare Before Christmas by   Henry Selick (United States)
The Night and the Moment by   Anna Maria Tatò (France/United Kingdom/Italy)
Woodstock 25th Anniversary Director' s Cut by  Michael Wadleigh (United States)
Metal Skin by  Geoffrey Wright (Australia)
Forrest Gump by   Robert Zemeckis (United States)

Autonomous sections

Venice International Film Critics' Week
The following feature films were selected to be screened as In Competition for this section:
 Accumulator 1 (Akumulátor 1) by Jan Svěrák (Czech Republic)
 Cracking Up by Matt Mitler (United States)
 Don’t Get Me Started by Arthur Ellis (United Kingdom)
 The Road to Paradise (Doroga V Ray) by Vitalij Moskalenko (Russia)
 Frankie, Jonny und die anderen... Schattenkämpfer by Hans-Erich Viet (Germany)
 Ilayum Mullum  (aka Leaves And Thorns) by K.P. Sasi (India)
 Iron Horsemen by Gilles Charmant (France)
 Passé-Composé (en. Past Imperfect) by Françoise Romand (France, Tunisia)
 That Eye, the Sky by John Ruane (Australia)

Awards
Golden Lion:
Before the Rain (Milčo Mančevski)
Vive L'Amour (Tsai Ming-liang)
Silver Lion:
Heavenly Creatures (Peter Jackson)
Little Odessa (James Gray)
Il toro (Carlo Mazzacurati)
Grand Special Jury Prize:
Natural Born Killers (Oliver Stone)
Golden Osella:
Best Director: Gianni Amelio (Lamerica)
Best Screenplay: Bigas Luna, Cuca Canals (La teta y la luna)
Best Cinematography: Christopher Doyle (Ashes of Time)
Volpi Cup:
Best Actor: Xia Yu (In the Heat of the Sun)
Best Actress: Maria de Medeiros (Três Irmãos)
Best Supporting Actor: Roberto Citran (Il toro)
Best Supporting Actress: Vanessa Redgrave (Little Odessa)
The President of the Italian Senate's Gold Medal:
Život a neobyčejná dobrodružství vojáka Ivana Čonkina (Jiří Menzel)
Career Golden Lion:
Al Pacino
Suso Cecchi d'Amico
Ken Loach
Golden Ciak:
La bella vita (Paolo Virzì)
FIPRESCI Prize:
Before the Rain (Milčo Mančevski)
Vive L'Amour (Tsai Ming-liang)
OCIC Award:
Lamerica (Gianni Amelio)

References

External links 

Venice Film Festival 1994 Awards on IMDb

Venice
Venice
Venice Film Festival
Film
Venice
September 1994 events in Europe